The 1903 Nebraska Cornhuskers football team represented the University of Nebraska as an independent during the 1903 college football season. Led by fourth-year head coach Walter C. Booth, the Cornhuskers compiled a record of 10–0, excluding one exhibition game. Nebraska played home games at Antelope Field in Lincoln, Nebraska.

Nebraska went undefeated for the second straight season, setting a new program record with 22 consecutive victories. One newspaper of the time wrote "Nebraska occupies a unique position in western football. Too strong to find fearful competitors, the Cornhuskers can almost weep with Alexander the Great because they have no more teams to conquer."

Schedule

Coaching staff

Roster

Game summaries

Lincoln High

In their sixth exhibition meeting, the Lincoln high schoolers managed to put points on the board against the Cornhuskers for the first time, remarkably ending Nebraska's run of 10 straight shutout victories.  Unsurprisingly, though, the University put up more, and pushed the perfect series record to 6-0.

Grand Island

Nebraska amassed nearly 800 yards of offense against Grand Island in the first meeting between the schools, the tenth straight shutout by the Cornhuskers defense.

South Dakota

Nebraska faced South Dakota for the first time in four years, dominating the Coyotes.

at Denver

Nebraska had 685 yards of offense to Denver's 15 in the first meeting between the schools. Frequent turnovers and a muddy playing surface likely prevented the Cornhuskers from scoring more than ten points.

Haskell

Nebraska dominated Haskell in the 100th game in NU history. Some historical records mention this as the first game in which a Nebraska mascot appeared, in this case a bulldog wearing a scarlet and cream blanket, though records suggest NU may have used a white bull terrier painted half red as a mascot as far back as 1893.

Colorado

Nebraska outgained Colorado 314 to 37 in the third game of the rivalry.

at Iowa

After three years without facing the Hawkeyes, Nebraska traveled to Iowa City for the first time. Nebraska's 14-game shutout streak ended after a fumble and penalty allowed Iowa to punch in a touchdown from NU's 2-yard line. Nebraska still won the game for its 18th straight victory.

Knox

Kansas

Kansas presented the stiffest challenge of the season for the Cornhuskers, who did not score until minutes remained in the game. That touchdown was enough to win as NU shut out the Jayhawks 6–0.

Bellevue

Illinois

Nebraska managed just 58 yards in a scoreless first half, but the Cornhuskers produced 276 yards and 16 points in the second half to defeat the Fighting Illini.

References

Nebraska
Nebraska Cornhuskers football seasons
College football undefeated seasons
Nebraska Cornhuskers football